The 1989–90 Southern Miss Golden Eagles basketball team represented the University of Southern Mississippi during the 1989–90 NCAA Division I men's basketball season. The Golden Eagles, led by head coach M. K. Turk, played their home games at Reed Green Coliseum and were members of the Metro Conference. They finished the season 20–12, 9–5 in Metro play to finish in second place behind Louisville. They lost in the championship game of the Metro tournament to top-seed Louisville. Southern Miss received an at-large bid to the 1990 NCAA basketball tournament where they lost in the opening round to La Salle and National Player of the Year Lionel Simmons.

Roster

Schedule and results

|-
!colspan=9 style=| Regular season

|-
!colspan=9 style=| Metro tournament

|-
!colspan=9 style=| 1990 NCAA tournament

Awards and honors
Clarence Weatherspoon – Metro Conference Player of the Year

References

Southern Miss Golden Eagles basketball seasons
Southern Miss
Southern Miss